Vladimir Salo (born 6 February 1974) is a retired Kyrgyzstani international football player who played for the Kyrgyzstan national football team.

Career statistics

International

Statistics accurate as of match played 17 November 2004

Honors
Kant-Oil
 Kyrgyzstan League (2): 1994, 1995
Dinamo Bishkek
 Kyrgyzstan League (1): 1997
Alga-PVO Bishkek
 Kyrgyzstan Cup (1): 1997
SKA-PVO Bishkek
 Kyrgyzstan League (1): 2000
 Kyrgyzstan Cup (4): 1998, 1999, 2000, 2003

References

Kyrgyzstani footballers
Kyrgyzstan international footballers
1974 births
Living people
People from Chüy Region
Association football defenders
Kyrgyzstani people of Russian descent
FC Volgar Astrakhan players